Bsharri ( Bšarrī; ; also Romanized Becharre, Bcharre, Bsharre, (Bcharre El Arez بشرّي الارز) is a town at an altitude of about   to .  It is located in the Bsharri District of the North Governorate in Lebanon.
Bsharri is the site of the only remaining original "Cedars of God" (Cedrus libani), and is the birthplace of the famous poet, painter and sculptor Khalil Gibran. A museum in the town honours his life and work.

Bsharri is also home to Lebanon's oldest skiing area, the Cedars Ski Resort, and to the country's first ski lift, built in 1953. The resort is about a two-hour drive and 130 km (81 mi) from Beirut. Qurnat as Sawdā Mountain in Bsharri is the highest peak in the Levant, at 3,088 meters above sea level.

The nearby site of the Holy Kadisha Valley shelters some of the oldest Christian monastic communities in the Middle East. Bsharri, a center of Maronite Christianity, also has the biggest cathedral in the region, the Saint Saba Cathedral, built by Anthony II Peter Arida. Bsharri is sometimes called "the city of churches" as it is home to some 37 churches. The Kadisha Valley and Cedars of God are a UNESCO World Heritage Site.

History 

 Maronite Christians fleeing persecution sought refuge in its mountainous terrain in the 7th Century AD.  The Kadisha Valley, below the town, became the spiritual center of the Maronite Church. The town was known as Buissera by the Crusades.

Residents of Bsharri are known for their distinct accent when they speak Lebanese Arabic. Unlike other parts of Lebanon, Aramaic was spoken in Bsharri well into the 19th century. As a result, Bsharri natives developed an unmistakably strong accent that lasts to this day.

During the Lebanese civil war, many young men joined the Lebanese Phalanges. In 1986 Samir Geagea, a Bsharri native, became head of the Lebanese Forces (LF) militia (now a political party), and later unsuccessfully ran for president of Lebanon in 2014. Many LF militants were drawn from the town during the civil war.

Culture 
Today, the town is located in a highly touristic zone including many attractions such as the Khalil Gibran Museum, the Kadisha Valley, the Kadisha Grotto, the Cedars of God forest and several ski resorts.
Bsharri is home to a Lebanese Red Cross First Aid Center, also to "The Maronite Scouts" that started their activities in early 2000.
On July 13, 2018, International Colombian singer of Lebanese heritage, Shakira, performed in Bsharri during the Cedars International Festival in the presence of 13,000 people. The visit was a part of her 2018 world tour, the El Dorado World Tour.

On March 22, 2019, The municipalities of Bsharri, Lebanon, and Val d’Isère, France inked an agreement to promote cultural exchange between the two towns. The cultural exchange program aims to build bridges for French and Lebanese youth that want to experience the unique cultural relationship and similarities the two countries possess. The mayor of Val d’Isère, Marc Bauer, led a French delegation to Lebanon to inaugurate a program aimed at promoting cultural and athletic exchange between the two famous ski locations.

Andrea Bocelli performed at the opening ceremony of The Cedars International Festival-Bsharri (CIF) before an audience of 8,000 people. Before the festival, Bocelli visited the Cedars of God, where he was received by the head of the Lebanese Forces Party, Samir Geagea.

Bsharri natives are also known for their strong Christian faith. Throughout the year, many religious festivities and commemorations take place in the town, attracting thousands from neighbouring villages.

Cedars ski resort 
The Cedars resort is located in the North of Lebanon. Skiers came to the resort as early as 1920, and have been returning there ever since. The first lift was installed by the government in 1953.

The Cedars resort has a slightly longer season than the others, sometimes beginning early November and often lasting until late April. Pisted and off-piste skiing is possible, as well as Nordic skiing and skidoo rides.

In summer 2005, The Cedars resort installed 3 new chairlifts to replace the old T-bars and extend the ski runs. 15 million US Dollars have lately been invested to upgrade the facilities and expand the resort to higher standard of in terms of accommodation, equipment, safety, and services.

There is no indication yet of when and whether will this be finalized. To comply with international regulations, a refuge with a capacity of 400 persons should also be built at the top of the gondola, and equipped with telescopes allowing vistas as far away as the island of Cyprus.

Geography

Climate
Bsharri has a continental Mediterranean climate (Csb/Dsb, according to the Köppen climate classification), with dry and mild summers and cold, snowy winters. Temperatures in the summer can go above  a few times per year.

Gallery

Notable residents

 Gibran Khalil Gibran, writer, poet and visual artist
 Antoine Choueiri (August 3, 1939 – March 9, 2010), a Lebanese media executive
 Samir Geagea, head of the Lebanese Forces party

See also
 Dimane

References

External links
 Lebanese Embassy (US) Section on Bsharri
 World66

Populated places in the North Governorate
Bsharri District
Maronite Christian communities in Lebanon